Panayot Kirov (born 1 February 1958) is a Bulgarian wrestler. He competed in the men's Greco-Roman 62 kg at the 1980 Summer Olympics.

References

1958 births
Living people
Bulgarian male sport wrestlers
Olympic wrestlers of Bulgaria
Wrestlers at the 1980 Summer Olympics
People from Yambol